Caloptilia liparoxantha is a moth of the family Gracillariidae. It is known from Queensland, Australia.

The larvae feed on Drypetes australasica. They probably mine the leaves of their host plant.

References

liparoxantha
Moths of Australia
Moths described in 1920